The lake of fire is a concept that appears in both the ancient Egyptian and Christian religions. In ancient Egypt, it appears as an obstacle on the journey through the underworld which can destroy or refresh the deceased. In Christianity, it is as a place of after-death punishment of the wicked. The phrase is used in five verses of the Book of Revelation. In the biblical context, the concept seems analogous to the Jewish Gehenna, or the more common concept of Hell. The image of the lake of fire was taken up by the early Christian Hippolytus of Rome in about the year 230 and has continued to be used by modern Christians.

Ancient Egyptian religion

Fiery rivers and lakes in the underworld are mentioned in works such as the Coffin Texts and the Book of the Dead. Around their edges sit flaming braziers or baboons. Ra would pass through this lake on his journey through the Duat, renewing his boat. Chapter 126 of the Book of the Dead is associated with this vignette and the text is addressed to the "four baboons who sit in the prow of the Barque of Re." The lake was one of the dangers encountered on the journey through the Duat and had a dual nature. The baboons who guarded the pool were a force that could refresh and protect the deceased if they knew the correct recitation or destroy them if they did not. In the 21st Dynasty, human figures are depicted within the lakes. These represent enemies of the king or gods and their inclusion within the pools ensures their permanent destruction. In this way, the deceased could avoid meeting a similar fate, and be victorious over the forces of chaos like Ra.

Christianity

Mark 9:43 has Jesus himself use the image of a punishing unquenchable fire:

Book of Revelation

The Book of Revelation has five verses that mention a "lake of fire":

A commonly accepted and traditional interpretation is that the "lake of fire" and the "second death" are symbolic of eternal pain, pain of loss and perhaps pain of the senses, as punishment for wickedness. However, the Greek words translated "torment" or "tormented" in English come from the root  with the original meaning of "the testing of gold and silver as a medium of exchange by the proving stone" and a later connotation of a person, especially a slave, "severely tested by torture" to reveal truth.

Denominational views
Jehovah's Witnesses interpret the "lake of fire" and "second death" of the Book of Revelation as referring to a complete and definitive annihilation of those cast into it.

Seventh-day Adventists believe in annihilation as well. They too believe that the lake of fire passage is referring to extinction, not to an eternal place of torment as understood in the mainstream Protestant interpretation.

Members of the Church of Jesus Christ of Latter-day Saints and other churches within the Latter Day Saint Movement read of a concept of the "lake of fire" in the Book of Mormon, in several passages of the record. The most descriptive instance of a "lake of fire" in the Book of Mormon occurs in Jacob 6:10, which reads, "Ye must go away into that lake of fire and brimstone, whose flames are unquenchable, and whose smoke ascendeth up forever and ever, which lake of fire and brimstone is endless torment." The Book of Mormon also refers to the lake of fire as a state of second death or spiritual death, where there is no hope for redemption or salvation until after the resurrection or, for sons of perdition, never.

Third century
Hippolytus of Rome ( 235) pictured Hades, the abode of the dead, as containing "a lake of unquenchable fire" at the edge of which the unrighteous "shudder in horror at the expectation of the future judgment, (as if they were) already feeling the power of their punishment". The lake of fire is described by Hippolytus unambiguously as the place of eternal torment for the sinners after the resurrection.

20th-century views
The Catholic Portuguese visionary Lúcia Santos reported that the Virgin Mary (Our Lady of Fatima) had given her a vision of Hell as a sea of fire:

Universalist eschatology

Early Christian Universalists, most notably Origen of Alexandria, and Gregory of Nyssa, understood the lake of fire as a symbolic purifying fire used to eliminate the dross from the gold, or a "refiner's crucible". Origen refers to the "lead of wickedness" that must be refined out of the gold. Origen obtained his Universalist views, known then as apocatastasis, from his mentor Clement of Alexandria, who was a student of Pantaenus. Origen explained the refining metaphor in response to a philosopher named Celsus who accused Christians of representing God as a merciless tormentor armed with fire.

In the view of Origen:

19th-century scholar Charles Bigg summarized Origen's view as, "Slowly yet certainly the blessed change must come, the purifying fire must eat up the dross and leave the pure gold. One by one we shall enter into rest, never to stray again. Then when death, the last enemy, is destroyed, when the tale of his children is complete, Christ will 'drink wine in the kingdom of his Father.' This is the end, when 'all shall be one, as Christ and the Father are one,' when 'God shall be all in all.'"

In the view of Gregory of Nyssa, "when death approaches to life, and darkness to light, and the corruptible to the incorruptible, the inferior is done away with and reduced to non-existence, and the thing purged is benefited, just as the dross is purged from gold by fire."

Further evidence corroborating their interpretation of the lake of fire as a "refiner's crucible" is that the Greek word commonly translated as "lake" also refers to something small, like a pond or a "pool", as translated in the Wycliffe and New American Bible (NABRE).

See also
 Ammit
 Eternal life (Christianity)
 Inferno (disambiguation)
 Lake of Fire (song)
 Lake of Fire (film)
 Purgatory

Notes

References

External links
Geoffrey W. Bromiley (ed.), The International Standard Bible Encyclopedia:K-P (Wm. B. Eerdmans Publishing 1995 ), p. 61, s.v. "Lake of fire"
Geoffrey W. Bromiley (ed.), The International Standard Bible Encyclopedia:Q-Z (Wm. B. Eerdmans Publishing 1995 ), p. 947, s.v. "Unquenchable fire"

Afterlife in Christianity
Biblical phrases
Book of Revelation
Christian terminology
Fire in religion
Hell (Christianity)